Pseudoeurycea robertsi is a species of salamander in the family Plethodontidae. It is endemic to Mexico and only known from the Nevado de Toluca, near Toluca in the State of Mexico. Its common name is Roberts' false brook salamander. The specific name robertsi honors the collector of the holotype, H. Radclyffe Roberts from the Philadelphia Academy of Sciences.

Description
The tail is laterally compressed and almost equal to SVL or shorter. The head is broad, rather flattened, and with truncate snout. There is a broad, orange stripe on the back and tail. The limbs are well developed. The first digit is very short; there is no webbing.

Habitat and conservation
Specimens have been found under rocks, logs, and loose bark of fallen logs and stumps. It is relatively common but has declined in the past and has a small area of occurrence. Moreover, there are threats to its habitat from tourism, forestry, agricultural and livestock activities, and urbanisation: formerly a national park, Nevado de Toluca is now an Área de protección de Flora y Fauna, conferring a weaker conservation status.

References

robertsi
Endemic amphibians of Mexico
Fauna of the Trans-Mexican Volcanic Belt
Amphibians described in 1939
Taxa named by Edward Harrison Taylor
Taxonomy articles created by Polbot